Sex at Dawn: The Prehistoric Origins of Modern Sexuality is a 2010 book about the evolution of human mating systems by Christopher Ryan and Cacilda Jethá. In opposition to what the authors see as the "standard narrative" of human sexual evolution, they contend that having multiple sexual partners was common and accepted in the environment of evolutionary adaptedness. The authors contend that mobile, self-contained groups of hunter-gatherers were the norm for humans before agriculture led to high population density. Before agriculture, according to the authors,  sex was relatively promiscuous and paternity was not a concern. This dynamic is similar to the mating system of bonobos. According to the book, sexual interactions strengthened the bond of trust in the groups. Far from causing jealousy, social equilibrium and reciprocal obligation were strengthened by playful sexual interactions.

The book generated a great deal of publicity in the popular press where it was met with generally positive reviews. Conversely, numerous scholars from related academic disciplines—such as anthropology, evolutionary psychology, primatology, biology, and sexology—have been highly critical of the book's methodology and conclusions, although some have commended its arguments.

Summary
The authors argue that human beings evolved in egalitarian hunter-gatherer bands in which sexual interaction was a shared resource, much like food, child care, and group defense.

The authors believe that much of evolutionary psychology has been conducted with a bias regarding human sexuality. They argue that the public and many researchers are guilty of the "Flintstonization" of a hunter-gatherer society, i.e. projecting modern assumptions and beliefs onto earlier societies. Thus the authors believe that there is a false assumption that our species is primarily monogamous and offer evidence to the contrary. They argue, for example, that our sexual dimorphism, testicle size, female copulatory vocalization, appetite for sexual novelty, various cultural practices, and hidden female ovulation, among other factors strongly suggest a non-monogamous, non-polygynous history. The authors argue that mate selection among pre-agricultural humans was not the subject of intragroup competition as sex was neither scarce nor commodified. Rather, sperm competition was a more important paternity factor than sexual selection. This behavior survives among some remaining hunter-forager groups that believe in partible paternity.

The authors argue as a result that conventional wisdom regarding human nature, as well as what they call the standard narrative of evolutionary psychology, is wrong. Their version of the "standard narrative" goes like this: Males and females assess the value of mates from perspectives based upon their differing reproductive agendas/capacities. According to the authors:"[The male] looks for signs of youth, fertility, health, absence of previous sexual experience, and likelihood of future sexual fidelity. In other words, his assessment is skewed toward finding a fertile, healthy young mate with many childbearing years ahead and no current children to drain his resources. She looks for signs of wealth (or at least prospects of future wealth), social status, physical health, and likelihood that he will stick around to protect and provide for their children. Her guy must be willing and able to provide materially for her (especially during pregnancy and breastfeeding) and their children (known as male parental investment)."Assuming the male and female meet each other's criteria, they mate and form a monogamous pair bond. Following this"she will be sensitive to indications that he is considering leaving (vigilant toward signs of infidelity involving intimacy with other women that would threaten her access to his resources and protection)—while keeping an eye out (around ovulation, especially) for a quick fling with a man genetically superior to her husband. He will be sensitive to signs of her sexual infidelities (which would reduce his all-important paternity certainty)—while taking advantage of short-term sexual opportunities with other women (as his sperm are easily produced and plentiful)." In human mating behavior, the authors state that "we don’t see [current mating behaviors] as elements of human nature so much as adaptations to social conditions—many of which were introduced with the advent of agriculture no more than ten thousand years ago."

The authors take a broad position that goes beyond sexual behavior, arguing that humans are generally more egalitarian and selfless than is often thought. In an interview, Ryan said, "So we’re not saying that sharing was so widespread because everyone was loving and sitting around the fire singing “Kumbaya” every night. The reason that sharing was so widespread—and continues to be in the remaining hunter-gatherer societies in existence—is because it's simply the most efficient way of distributing risk among a group of people." However, the Neolithic revolution led to the advent of private property and the accumulation of power and completely changed people's lifestyles. This change in lifestyle fundamentally altered the way people behave and has left modern humans in a situation where their instincts are at odds with the societies in which they live.

The authors do not take an explicit position in the book regarding the morality or desirability of monogamy or alternative sexual behavior in modern society but argue that people should be made aware of our behavioral history so that they can make better-informed choices.

Reception

Popular media reception
About six weeks after publication, Sex at Dawn debuted on The New York Times best-seller list at #24 and last appeared there as #33 three weeks later.

Despite significant academic criticism of the research, reasoning, and conclusions of Sex at Dawn, the book received praise from many non-academic reviewers in the media. The book was praised by syndicated sex-advice columnist Dan Savage, who wrote: "Sex At Dawn is the single most important book about human sexuality since Alfred Kinsey unleashed Sexual Behavior in the Human Male on the American public in 1948."
Newsweek Kate Daily wrote, "This book takes a swing at pretty much every big idea on human nature: that poverty is an inevitable consequence of life on earth, that mankind is by nature brutish, and, most important, that humans evolved to be monogamous. ... [Sex at Dawn] sets out to destroy almost each and every notion of the discipline, turning the field on its head and taking down a few big names in science in the process. ... Funny, witty, and light ... the book is a scandal in the best sense, one that will have you reading the best parts aloud and reassessing your ideas about humanity's basic urges well after the book is done... Ryan and Jethá do an admirable job of poking holes in the prevailing evo-psych theories and are more apt to turn to biological, rather than psychological, evidence. That doesn’t mean their thesis is bulletproof. But it does mean there’s a lot of value in reconsidering basic assumptions about our beginnings that we widely accept today as gospel."

The book was chosen as NPR host Peter Sagal's favorite book of 2010.

Science blogger Kevin Bonham also responded favorably to the book. He called the argument of Ryan and Jethá that "pre-agrarian human societies were exceedingly promiscuous" a "convincing" and well-documented one. However, Bonham cautioned his readers that "I can’t be certain that the authors aren’t cherry-picking examples that support their conclusions."

Megan McArdle of The Atlantic criticized the book on her blog. She stated: "it reads like an undergraduate thesis—cherry-picked evidence stretched far out of shape to support their theory.  The language is breathless rather than scientific, and they don't even attempt to paper over the enormous holes in their theory that people are naturally polyamorous."

Scholarly reception
In contrast to the popular media reception, scholars have overwhelmingly reviewed Sex at Dawn negatively. Ryan originally tried to publish the book with academic publisher Oxford University Press where it was rejected after it failed the peer review process. Most academics have been critical of the book's methodology and its conclusions. Scholars with established expertise in disciplines related to the book (such as anthropology, primatology, biology, sexology, and evolutionary psychology) have commented on the book in self-published blogs and reviews, articles in the popular press, and in peer-reviewed academic journals.

The book received the 2011 Ira and Harriet Reiss Theory Award from the Society for the Scientific Study of Sexuality.

Positive critiques
Some reviews praise the book for confronting established theories of evolutionary psychology. For example, anthropology professor Barbara J. King wrote "...lapses do mar more than one passage in the book. Yet on balance, Sex at Dawn is a welcome marriage of data from social science, animal behavior, and neuroscience."

Eric Michael Johnson, a graduate student in the history of science and primatology, credits Ryan and Jethá for advancing their argument using evidence not available to its previous advocates and doing so using a "relaxed writing style and numerous examples from modern popular culture." Johnson wrote that the authors' conclusion, far from being completely novel and unsupported, had been advocated by a minority of psychologists and anthropologists for decades. As examples, Johnson cites Sarah Hrdy, David P. Barash, and Judith Lipton. Sarah Hrdy, an American anthropologist and primatologist, "advocated a promiscuous mating system for humans in 1999 in The Woman That Never Evolved. According to Johnson, psychologist David P. Barash and psychiatrist Judith Lipton presented similar arguments in 2001. 

However, Barash has also criticized Sex at Dawn, stating:Sex at Dawn has been taken as scientifically valid by large numbers of naïve readers … whereas it is an intellectually myopic, ideologically driven, pseudo-scientific fraud.

Negative critiques
The book was criticized for its alleged "biased reporting of data, theoretical and evidentiary shortcomings, and problematic assumptions" in a pair of book reviews by anthropologist Ryan Ellsworth. Writing in the peer-reviewed journal Evolutionary Psychology, Ellsworth argues that the book misrepresents the state of current research on sexual behavior. Ellsworth argues that while promiscuity has certainly been part of human behavior, it is "doubtful that this is because we are promiscuous at heart (this may apply to the behavior of most women more than the desire of most men), shackled by the trappings of a post-agricultural dilemma of our own devices, unable to return to the ancestral days of sexual communism." Noting that he could find no previous academic reviews of Sex at Dawn, Ellsworth suggests that the book's positive reception in popular media will project "a distorted portrayal of current theory and evidence on evolved human sexuality" to the general public. Ellsworth and colleagues also note that contrary to what is argued in Sex at Dawn, "the existence of partible paternity in some societies does not prove that humans are naturally promiscuous any more so than the existence of monogamy in some societies proves that humans are naturally monogamous".

Ryan argues that although Ellsworth makes some valid points, he misunderstood his and Jethá's central argument. According to Ryan, they did not argue that human sexuality was the same as bonobo sexuality; but rather that coitus was more frequent than is generally acknowledged, and that a typical human being would have had multiple partners within relatively short periods of time (i.e. each estrus cycle of a female). He argues that the main point of the book is to discredit "the standard narrative." He thinks reviewers read too much into the book, which merely seeks to challenge monogamy, rather than categorically reject it in favor of an alternative relationship model.

Sexuality scholar Emily Nagoski agreed with many of the book's criticisms of evolutionary psychology and the book's thesis "that monogamy is not the innate sociosexual system of humans" but concluded that "they come to the wrong conclusion about the nature of human sexuality" due to errors of reasoning and understanding of evolutionary science. Nagoski ultimately concluded the book was "sloppily reasoned, contemptuous, and ignorant."

In 2012, independent researcher Lynn Saxon released Sex at Dusk, a rebuttal to Sex at Dawn which itemized misrepresented citations and research errors found throughout the latter. In an approving Chronicle of Higher Education review of Sex at Dusk, David Barash, co-author of The Myth of Monogamy: Fidelity and Infidelity in Animals and People wrote that Ryan and Jethá "ignore and/or misrepresent reams of anthropology and biology in their eagerness to make a brief for some sort of Rousseau-ian sexual idyll that exists—and/or existed—only in their overheated libidinous imaginations." Barash favorably quotes Saxon's criticism of Sex at Dawn for being "almost all about sex and not much about children ... [even though evolution] is very much about reproduction—variation in reproductive success is evolution" and endorses Saxon's characterization of the book as an "intellectually myopic, ideologically driven, pseudo-scientific fraud." In Dusk, Saxon further accuses Ryan and Jethá of trying to advance a "redistributive" approach to contemporary female sexuality, highlighting that, for all their postulating that prehistoric women were uninhibited in their choice of males with whom to have sex, the authors at no point argue that prehistoric men were any different from contemporary men in their mating preferences.

She ultimately condemns Ryan and Jethá's argument as "a contemporary middle-class, child-free, sex-obsessed, male fantasy projected back onto prehistory."

Herbert Gintis, economist and evolutionary scholar, wrote that although the authors' conclusions are "usually not far from the truth," "Ryan and Jethá justify their position mostly by deploying anecdotal and unsystematic anthropological evidence, and the authors have no anthropological credentials" in a book review on Amazon.com. Gintis critiques the idea that human males were unconcerned with parentage, "which would make us unlike any other species I can think of" and suggests that their characterization of prehistoric human warfare is incorrect.

Some reviews argue that Ryan and Jethá set up a strawman argument with the "standard narrative." Both Gintis and Nagoski argue there is no "standard narrative" in modern scientific literature. Nagoski says, "At no point does the book even attempt to convince me that this is the narrative; it simply asserts that it is so and moves on. As a person who has read a great deal of the science they cite, I can tell you that among scientists, S@D’s narrative is not remotely 'standard.' I could buy the argument that it is a CULTURAL narrative, and if that were the claim the authors were making, a great deal of my struggles with the book would be resolved."

Evolutionary psychologist Steven Pinker called the book "pseudoscience" in a tweet.

The biologist Alan Dixson also disputed key arguments about monogamy in Sex at Dawn.

The anthropologist Peter B. Gray and Justin R. Garcia dismissed Sex at Dawn in Evolution and Human Sexual Behavior (2013), writing that it was misleading and that the evidence did not support Ryan and Jetha's views.

Evolutionary psychologists Peter K. Jonason and Rhonda Nicole Balzarini criticize the book for committing the naturalistic fallacy, getting the evolutionary history of humans wrong, ignoring selection occurring at the level of individuals/genes and instead assuming group selection.

Evolutionary psychologist Diana Fleischman has critiqued the book for inaccurately portraying evolutionary history.

Psychologist and social theory author William von Hippel characterized the central argument of the book as "bullshit" and later as questionable among him and his peers.

References

External links
 Sex at Dawn's official site archived Feb 2014

2010 non-fiction books
American non-fiction books
Books by Christopher Ryan
English-language books
HarperCollins books
Sexual orientation and science
Non-fiction books about sexuality